Calliostoma torrei is a species of sea snail, a marine gastropod mollusk in the family Calliostomatidae.

Description
The size of the shell varies between 20 mm and 41 mm.

Distribution
This species occurs in the Caribbean Sea and the Gulf of Mexico at depths between 704 m and 863 m.

References

 Clench, W. J. and C. G. Aguayo. 1940. Notes and descriptions of new deep-water Mollusca obtained by the Harvard-Habana Expedition off Cuba. III.. Memorias de la Sociedad Cubana de Historia Natural "Felipe Poey" 14: 77–94, pls. 14–16. 
 Quinn, J. F., Jr. 1992. New species of Calliostoma Swainson, 1840 (Gastropoda: Trochidae), and notes on some poorly known species from the Western Atlantic Ocean. Nautilus 106: 77–114
 Rosenberg, G., F. Moretzsohn, and E. F. García. 2009. Gastropoda (Mollusca) of the Gulf of Mexico, Pp. 579–699 in Felder, D.L. and D.K. Camp (eds.), Gulf of Mexico–Origins, Waters, and Biota. Biodiversity. Texas A&M Press, College Station, Texas.

External links

torrei
Gastropods described in 1940